Charles Jarrott (16 June 1927 – 4 March 2011) was a British film and television director. He was best known for costume dramas he directed for producer Hal B. Wallis, among them Anne of the Thousand Days, which earned him a Golden Globe for Best Director in 1970.

Although Anne was nominated for several awards, critic Pauline Kael wrote in her book Reeling (Warner Books, p. 198), that as a director, Jarrott had no style or personality, and that he was just "a traffic manager." Nevertheless, his next film, Mary, Queen of Scots, was nominated for six Academy Awards and several Golden Globes.

Jarrott was the son of English racing car driver and businessman Charles Jarrott, and was married to Rosemary Palin (1949–57), actress Katharine Blake (1959–82) and Suzanne Bledsoe (1992-2003). Jarrott also served in the Royal Navy during World War II.

Jarrott died on 4 March 2011 from prostate cancer.

Selected filmography
 Time to Remember (1962)
 Anne of the Thousand Days (1969)
 Mary, Queen of Scots (1971)
 Lost Horizon (1973)
 The Dove (1974)
 Escape from the Dark (1976) (aka The Littlest Horse Thieves)
 The Other Side of Midnight (1977)
 The Last Flight of Noah's Ark (1980)
 Condorman (1981)
 The Amateur (1981)
 The Boy in Blue (1986)
 Poor Little Rich Girl: The Barbara Hutton Story (1987)
 Lucy & Desi: Before the Laughter (1991)
 Lady Boss (1992)
 Morning Glory (1993)
 The Secret Life of Algernon (1997)
 Turn of Faith (2001)

References

External links
 

1927 births
2011 deaths
Best Director Golden Globe winners
British film directors
British television directors
Burials at Forest Lawn Memorial Park (Hollywood Hills)